Heart Rhythm is a peer-reviewed medical journal published by Elsevier that covers the study and management of cardiac arrhythmia. It is the official journal of the Heart Rhythm Society, the Cardiac Electrophysiology Society, and the Pediatric & Congenital Electrophysiology Society. Its major focus is research and therapy of heart rhythm disorders, including mechanisms and electrophysiology, clinical and experimental, genetics, ablation, devices, drugs, and surgery. Other sections include contemporary reviews, unique case reports, viewpoints, Hands On, images, creative concepts, EP news, Josephson and Wellens ECGs, and editorial commentaries.

History
The first issue of Heart Rhythm was published in May 2004 with Douglas Zipes, MD, FHRS, as the founding editor in chief. The editor in chief since 2014 has been Peng-Sheng Chen, MD, FHRS.

The companion journals to Heart Rhythm are HeartRhythm Case Reports, which was founded in 2015 and Heart Rhythm O2, which launched in April 2020.

Abstracting and indexing 
The journal is abstracted and indexed in Academic OneFile, CINAHL, Current Contents, EMBASE, Excerpta Medica, InfoTrac Custom, MEDLINE, Science Citation Index, and Scopus.

References

External links 
 

Cardiology journals
Publications established in 2004
Monthly journals
Elsevier academic journals
English-language journals